In mathematics, the Lagrange reversion theorem gives series or formal power series expansions of certain implicitly defined functions; indeed, of compositions with such functions.

Let v be a function of x and y in terms of another function f such that

Then for any function g, for small enough y:

If g is the identity, this becomes

In which case the equation can be derived using perturbation theory.

In 1770, Joseph Louis Lagrange (1736–1813) published his power series solution of the implicit equation for v mentioned above. However, his solution used cumbersome series expansions of logarithms. In 1780, Pierre-Simon Laplace (1749–1827) published a simpler proof of the theorem, which was based on relations between partial derivatives with respect to the variable x and the parameter y. Charles Hermite (1822–1901) presented the most straightforward proof of the theorem by using contour integration.

Lagrange's reversion theorem is used to obtain numerical solutions to Kepler's equation.

Simple proof
We start by writing:

Writing the delta-function as an integral we have:

The integral over k then gives  and we have:

Rearranging the sum and cancelling then gives the result:

References

External links
Lagrange Inversion [Reversion] Theorem on MathWorld
Cornish–Fisher expansion, an application of the theorem
Article on equation of time contains an application to Kepler's equation.

Theorems in analysis
Inverse functions

fr:Théorème d'inversion de Lagrange